The Darden-Gifford House is a historic house in rural White County, Arkansas, north of Arkansas Highway 5 near the community of Rose Bud. It is a two-story wood-frame structure, with a side gable roof, weatherboard siding, and a two-story porch sheltered by a projecting gable-roofed section. It was built in 1887 by J. S. Darden, a local sawmill owner, and was built using the choicest cuts from his mill, resulting in extremely fine quality woodwork.

The house was listed on the National Register of Historic Places in 1976.

See also
National Register of Historic Places listings in White County, Arkansas

References

Houses on the National Register of Historic Places in Arkansas
Houses completed in 1887
Houses in White County, Arkansas
National Register of Historic Places in White County, Arkansas
1887 establishments in Arkansas